Charles Gerwyn Rice Lewis was a Welsh Anglican priest, most notably the  third Archdeacon of Newport.<

Lewis served with the Royal Flying Corps during World War I. was educated at St David's College, Lampeter and  ordained deacon in 1923 and priest in 1924. After  curacies in Canton, Pwllgwaun and St Woolos, Newport he held incumbencies at Treherbert and All saints' Newport. Lewis was a Chaplain to the Forces during World War II. He was  Archdeacon of Newport from 1953  archdeacon from 1949 until his death on 17 July 1964,  during which time he was also Vicar of St Mellons.

References

20th-century Welsh Anglican priests
Alumni of the University of Wales, Lampeter
1964 deaths
Archdeacons of Newport
Welsh military chaplains
Royal Flying Corps personnel
British Army personnel of World War I
British Army personnel of World War II
Royal Army Chaplains' Department officers